"Real Muthaphuckkin G's," or "Real Compton City G's" in its radio edit, is a song released in August 1993 by American rapper Eazy-E with guest rappers Gangsta Dresta and BG Knocc Out. Peaking at #42 on Billboard's Hot 100, and the most successful of Eazy's singles as a solo artist, it led an EP, also his most successful, It's On (Dr. Dre) 187um Killa. This diss track answers Eazy's former N.W.A bandmate Dr. Dre and his debuting, guest rapper Snoop Dogg, who had dissed Eazy on Dre's first solo album, The Chronic. The single was nominated for a Grammy in 1994 and according to some sources sold 5 million copies in the U.S.

Dresta wrote his own verses and ghostwrote Eazy-E's verses. B.G. Knocc Out wrote his own verse.

Backstory

In 1991, Dr. Dre left N.W.A and, with Suge Knight, launched Death Row Records. It released Dre's The Chronic, which in 1993 broke gangsta rap onto pop radio. On the album, Dre and guest rapper Snoop Doggy Dogg, a star on the rise at the time, diss Eazy-E in skits, in the single "Fuck wit Dre Day" plus its music video, and, closing the album, in the hidden track "Bitches Ain't Shit."

To seize the moment, Eazy planned an EP, shorter than an album. Its lead single originally slated was "It's On." But an Eazy associate got word of two halfbrothers, both Nutty Blocc Compton Crips, who rapped. Recently released from several years of youth incarceration, Dresta had forged his rap skill through activities inside, whereby his reputation preceded him onto the streets.

Visiting the brothers' house, Eazy's associate found Dresta and took him to the studio, where Eazy told him tales of Dre. Dresta, thereby forming the song concept, wrote all the lyrics for an Eazy and Dresta duet. Yet the next day, Dresta brought to the studio his brother Knocc Out, who, improvising it on the spot, added a verse. And so Eazy's leading answer to Dre became "Real Muthaphuckkin G's."

Content 
The three "Real Muthaphukkin G's" rappers, claiming gangster authenticity, mock Dre and Snoop as "studio gangstas." Also disputing Dre's masculinity, Eazy alludes to Dre's androgynous styling, by attire and makeup, in the 1980s DJ crew World Class Wreckin' Cru, which, in line with Los Angeles county's hip hop scene until N.W.A, was also an electro rap group, occasionally donning glitzy styling. In the process, Eazy briefly disses Snoop as an "anorexic rapper" who weighs "60 pounds" when "wet and wearing boots."

Back to Dre, Eazy disparages the sentiment that beating a woman makes one a man, as Dre's assault of TV personality Dee Barnes was highly publicized. Further, Eazy refers to the single "Fuck wit Dre Day" as "Eazy's pay day." Dre's contract with Eazy's label, Ruthless Records, left Eazy profiting from Dre's earnings through Death Row. Finally, claiming rumors that Death Row is Dre's "boot camp," Eazy calls its CEO, Suge Knight, widely known for strongarm tactics in the music business, Dr. Dre's "sergeant."

Music video
The music video, written and directed by Eazy-E's longtime Ruthless video director Marty Thomas, was shot in Compton, California. It opens with aerial shots of Compton streets and scenes of lowriders, gangsters, and the metro Blue Line. There are numerous cameo appearances: Kokane, Rhythm D, Cold 187um, Dirty Red, Krazy Dee, Steffon, H.W.A., DJ Slip from Compton's Most Wanted, Young Hoggs, Blood of Abraham, K9 Compton, and Tony-A.

Once Eazy-E, on camera, raps, "All of a sudden, Dr. Dre is the G thang / But on his old album covers, he was a she-thang," shown is a photo of Dre on a World Class Wreckin' Cru album cover, predating N.W.A, wearing a white, sequined jumpsuit and detectable makeup. Related cover photos appear several times during the video. On the other hand, nearly closing the video, in Eazy's hand, artificially blurred out, is perhaps a pistol while he alleges that if disobedient, Dre would get popped by Suge Knight's Smith & Wesson.

Previously, in Dr. Dre's music video for "Fuck wit Dre Day," actor and comedian Anthony "A. J." Johnson parodies Eazy-E as "Sleazy-E." In the "Real Muthaphuckkin G's" video, A. J. reprises the Sleazy-E role. As Eazy-E's music video opens, still jittering, Sleazy stands roadside, holding up the sign WILL RAP FOR FOOD. But Eazy's posse, including Dresta and Knocc Out, chase him through town, and finally pull him into van. As the video closes, Sleazy lies, apparently dead, at his original, roadside spot. The clean version's video closes instead with Sleazy, running again, falling flat at a Leaving Compton sign.

Although paid in advance,  Johnson failed to appear for his second of two days shooting. Eventually, he publicly confirmed the speculation that he had been threatened by Death Row or by its associates. Johnson explained that Suge Knight had summoned him to his office and threatened him with a gun, eliciting A. J.'s agreement to abandon the video shoot. Johnson informed Eazy of the threat, and recommended fellow comedian Arnez J to replace him in the video.

Charts

See also
List of notable diss tracks

References

External links
Genius: Real Muthaphuckkin G's - Lyrics

1993 songs
Eazy-E songs
G-funk songs
Diss tracks